Reginald Cox Farnell (1891–1972) was an Australian rugby league player who played in the 1910s and 1920s.

Playing career
Farnell was a premiership winning rugby league player for North Sydney. Farnell played six seasons with North Sydney between 1915-1918 and 1922-1923. 

He also played one season for Eastern Suburbs in 1919. Farnell played prop forward in the victorious North Sydney team that won the 1922 Grand Final, and also made one appearance for New South Wales in 1919.

Farrell died at Tweed Heads, New South Wales on 11 July 1972, aged 79.

References

North Sydney Bears players
Australian rugby league players
New South Wales rugby league team players
Sydney Roosters players
1891 births
1972 deaths
Rugby league players from Sydney
Rugby league props